Kupino is the name of several urban and rural inhabited localities (towns, villages, and selos) in Russia.

Urban localities
Kupino, Novosibirsk Oblast, a town in Kupinsky District of Novosibirsk Oblast

Rural localities
Kupino, Belgorod Oblast, a selo in Shebekinsky District of Belgorod Oblast
Kupino, Samara Oblast, a selo in Bezenchuksky District of Samara Oblast